Joseph William Anderson (born 6 February 2001) is an English professional footballer who plays for Sunderland, as a defender.

Career
Born in Stalybridge, Anderson was a youth product of Liverpool, before moving to cross-town rivals Everton's youth academy at the age of 15 in 2016. On 3 July 2019, he signed his first professional contract with Everton for two years. On 7 July 2022, he signed a two-year extension to the contract ending in 2024.

Anderson signed for Sunderland in January 2023. He made his professional and senior debut with Sunderland as a late substitute in a 1–1 EFL Championship tie with Millwall on 4 February 2023.

Style of play
Originally a left-back or left midfielder, he converted to centre-back as an under-18 with Everton.

Career statistics

References

2001 births
Living people
English footballers
Liverpool F.C. players
Everton F.C. players
Sunderland A.F.C. players
English Football League players
Association football defenders
People from Stalybridge